Devil Dog may refer to:

 Devil Dog, a nickname in the U.S. Marines
 Devil Dogs (film) a 1928 film
 Devil Dog: The Hound of Hell, the 1978 horror movie 
 Devil Dog Dawson, a 1921 American western film
 Devil Dogs, the rock band
 Drake's Devil Dogs, the snack food
 Hellbender, another name for a species of salamander
 Another word for Hellhound
 "Devil Dogs", a song by heavy-metal band Sabaton